Udea austriacalis is a species of moth in the family Crambidae. It is found from Spain, France, Switzerland, Italy, Austria, Romania, Bulgaria, Albania and Greece to Russia and China.

References

Moths described in 1851
austriacalis
Moths of Europe